The Crna Reka Monastery (lit. "Black River Monastery") is a 13th-century Serbian Orthodox monastery located in Ribariće, Tutin, southwestern Serbia. In the 16th century, Ottoman attacks forced the monks of Sopoćani to flee to the secluded Crna Reka Monastery.

See also
 Hermitage of St. Peter Koriški

References

External links
 History of Crna Reka Monastery 

13th-century Serbian Orthodox church buildings
Christian monasteries established in the 13th century
Cultural Monuments of Great Importance (Serbia)
Serbian Orthodox monasteries in Serbia
Medieval Serbian Orthodox monasteries
13th-century establishments in Serbia
Medieval sites in Serbia
Cave monasteries
Caves of Serbia